All or Nothing  is a game show which aired on the Russian Channel One. It was one of the Russian versions of the Deal or No Deal show. The host was Nikolai Fomenko and the grand prize is 3,000,000 Russian ruble (about US$102,700). It was premiered on 20 September 2004.

Box Values

2004 Russian television series debuts
Deal or No Deal
Russian game shows
2005 Russian television series endings
2000s Russian television series
Channel One Russia original programming